Anthony Foyt may refer to:

A. J. Foyt, (born 1935), U.S. racing driver who rarely goes by "Anthony"
A. J. Foyt IV (born 1984), U.S. race car driver who commonly goes by the name "Anthony" to differentiate himself from his grandfather